Saba Foulad Zagros is an Iranian steel re-bar manufacturing company headquartered in Tehran, Iran. The company's plant is located in Sefiddasht Industrial Park in Borujen County. Saba Foulad Zagros was founded in December 2009 as a private company  and it is considered as one of the major industrial poles of the Chaharmahal and Bakhtiari Province as well as the Iranian re-bar making industry. Since 2009, Saba Foulad Zagros is a member of the Iranian Steel Producers Association and its CEO, Hamidreza Taherizadeh, holds the position of the vice president of the association as of December 2014.

History

Saba Foulad Zagros was founded in December 2009 as a private company in Sefiddasht Industrial Park in Borujen County, Iran. The installation of the production line and the facilities was processed by the domestic as well as foreign contractors with technical support of companies such as Siemens.

Development plan

The company plans to expand by launching a continuous casting plant in order to produce steel billets

Controversy

In 2016 a viral YouTube post presented steel re-bar manufactured by Saba Foulad Zagros breaking with minimal force applied.  It was considered too brittle, thus too dangerous to use in construction.

Certifications

As of Dec 2014, Saba Foulad Zagros holds the following certifications:

 Institute of Standards and Industrial Research of Iran
 ISO 9001
 ISO 14001
 ISO 18001

Honors and recognition

 Exemplary Provincial Industrial Plan (2010)
 Exemplary Provincial Industrial Plan (2011)
 Premier Contributor to the Development of Chaharmahal and Bakhtiari Province (2013)

See also

Global steel industry trends
Hot rolling
Rolling mill
Steel producers
Steel mill

References

External links
Official website
Steel Producer Association (Persian)

Steel companies of Iran
Manufacturing companies based in Tehran
Borujen County
Manufacturing companies established in 2009
Chaharmahal and Bakhtiari Province
Iranian companies established in 2009